, commonly referred to as Globis and stylized as GLOBIS, is a Japanese private business education company headquartered in Banchō, Chiyoda, Tokyo, Japan. Globis is one of the largest corporate training providers in Japan, with over 2 million professionals having completed programs. It has published 130 business management books which sold a combined 3.5 million copies. E-learning platforms GLOBIS Manabihodai and GLOBIS Unlimited have a combined subscriber number of over 210,000.

Globis has overseas subsidiaries in Bangkok, Thailand, Brussels, Belgium, San Francisco, United States, Shanghai, China, and Singapore. The Globis Group includes the Graduate School of Management, Globis University, which is the largest business school in Japan with a total enrollment of 2,683 students and an annual intake of 1,050 students. Another group addition is Globis Capital Partners, a hands-on VC firm with a cumulative fund size of over ¥160 billion JPY (approximately $1.2 billion) invested in over 190 Japanese companies in 2022.

History
Globis Corporation was founded by Yoshito Hori in 1992. The company was started with a capital of 800,000 yen (about $7,500 USD).

Globis Group

Globis University

See also
Graduate School of Management, Globis University

References

External links
Globis Corporation 
Globis Capital Partners 
Graduate School of Management, Globis University 

1992 establishments in Japan
Chiyoda, Tokyo
Companies based in Tokyo
Education companies based in Tokyo
Education companies established in 1992
Globis
Holding companies based in Tokyo
Holding companies of Japan
Japanese brands
Japanese companies established in 1992